A list of all international Test matches played by Los Pumas.

Legend

1910s

1920s

1930s

1940s

1950s

1960s

1970s

1980s

1990s

2000s

2010s

2020s

References 

 
Argentina